Ashtamichira is a village in Thrissur district in the Indian state of Kerala.

The vast paddy fields and coconut groves that surround Ashtamichira represent the core strength of the area, which is agriculture. Ashtamichira has historically been an agrarian community, but the economic growth of India in the past decade has started to show its effect in the community's shift away from agriculture.

Geography and demographics 
The closest major cities are Chalakudy Thrissur and Cochin.

Location
  south west of Thrissur
  north of Cochin
  west of Chalakudy
  north of Mala
  south east of Irinjalakuda
  south east  of Kodungallur - The historical place, former kingdom and historical port (mussris).

Demographics
Population - 
Language - Malayalam
Religions - Hinduism, Christianity, Islam

Transport infrastructure

By Road

By Rail
Chalakudy is served by all major trains running through Kerala and is the best access to Ashtamichira for long distance travelers.

By Air

Places of worship 

Nearest places of worship are:

Temples
Ashtamichira Mahadeva Kshetram
Urundolil Sree Bhagavathy Kshetram
Pambumekkatu Mana
Chakkamparambu Kshetram
Kannankattil Kshetram
Maniyankavu Kshetram
Mosques
Kattikarakunnu Juma Masjid
Ashtamichira east Juma Masjid
Umer Farooq Juma Masjid & Hilaliya Madrassa, Marekkad
Churches
Assemblies of God Church, Ashtamchira.
India Pentecostal Church of God, Ashtamchira.
St. Thomas Forane Church, Ambazhakadu
St. Antonys Church, Puliyilakunnu

References

External links

Villages in Thrissur district